Expresso Pequi or Expresso Brasília-Goiânia is a planned rail line linking the Brazilian capital city Brasília with Goiânia. The name Pequi refers to the Caryocar brasiliense fruit which is grown in the region.

History
In 2009, construction of the TAV High-speed railway between Brasília/Anápolis/Goiânia was announced. The construction of the line was expected to be financed by federal funds in partnership with the governments of Goiás and the Federal District, with the goal of developing the area between the two capitals.

Route
The  route would allow a journey time of 1 hour 30 minutes between Brasília and Goiânia, with intermediate stations at Alexânia and Anápolis.

See also
 High-speed rail in Brazil
 Trens Intercidades

References

Electric railways in Brazil
Rail transport in Brazil
Proposed railway lines in Brazil